Sarasvati Pushkaram is a festival of River Sarasvati normally occurs once in 12 years. Saraswati River is considered as the 'Antarvahini' (invisible river) which flows at Triveni Sangam. This Pushkaram is observed for a period  of 12 days from the time of entry of Jupiter into Mithuna rasi (Gemini).

See also
Kumbh Mela
Pushkaram

References

Religious festivals in India
Water and Hinduism
Hindu festivals
Religious tourism in India
Hindu pilgrimages
Sarasvati River